The Ugljevik Coal Mine also known as Bogutovo Coal Mine is an open-pit coal mine located in the Republika Srpska. The mine has coal reserves amounting to 336.1 million tonnes of lignite, one of the largest coal reserves in Europe and the world. The mine has an annual production capacity of 0.8 million tonnes of coal.

See also 
Ugljevik Power Plant

References 

Coal mines in Bosnia and Herzegovina
Ugljevik